Munger, formerly spelt as Monghyr, is a twin city and a Municipal Corporation situated in the Indian state of Bihar. It is the administrative headquarters of Munger district and Munger Division. Munger was one of the major cities in Eastern India and undivided Bengal during Mughal period and British Raj. It is one of the major political,cultural,educational and commercial center of Bihar and  Eastern India. Munger is situated about 180km from east of capital city Patna, about 480km west of Eastern India's largest city kolkata and 1200km from country's capital New Delhi.

Historically, Munger is known for being an ancient seat of rule. The twin city comprises Munger and Jamalpur situated on the southern bank of the river Ganges. It is situated 08 km from Jamalpur Junction,180 km east of capital city Patna and 430 Km from Kolkata the capital of West Bengal.

Munger is said to have been founded by the Guptas (4th century CE) and contains a fort that houses the tomb of the Muslim saint Shah Mushk Nafā (died 1497). In 1763, the Nawab of Bengal Mir Qasim made Munger his capital and built an arsenal and several palaces. It was constituted a municipality in 1864.

Geography

Climate
The climate of Munger is subtropical (warm in summer and cold during winter). The Köppen climate classification sub-type for this climate is humid subtropical.

Demographics
As per 2011 census, Munger Municipal Corporation has a total population of 213,101 out of which 113,173 were males and 99,928 were females. It had a sex ratio of 883. The population between 0 and 6 years was 29,260. The literacy rate of the 7+ population was 81.83 per cent.

Economy
Indian Railways operates of Asia's largest and oldest railway workshops at Jamalpur. This was set up by the British Raj in 1862.

Munger has also ITC Factory established by the British. Ordinance Gun Factory Munger , ITC Milk Dairy and many others.

Culture
Munger is known for Sita Manpatthar (Sita charan) Sitacharan temple situated on a boulder in the middle of the Ganges in Munger (Mithilanchal) is the main center of public faith regarding Chhath festival.  It is believed that Mata Sita performed the Chhaith festival in Munger. It was only after this that Chhath Mohaparv started.  That is why Chhath Mohaparva is celebrated with great pomp in Munger.Munger is also famous for Durga Puja Mahotsav which is celebrated for 10 days. The first nine days are celebrated with great fervor across the city. On the 10th day evening, one side rushes to the Polo Grounds for Ravan Badh, while the other side prepares for a unique ritual known as "Shobha Yatra." The “Shobha Yatra of Badi Durga of Sadipur” marks the importance of Badi Durga of Munger all over the country. People from all over the city join this yatra, and the deity is immersed early in the morning in the holy river Ganges.

Places of interest
Munger Fort, covers an area of around 222 acres
Chandika Asthan, a sacred Shakti-Peeth
Kastaharni Ghat on the Ganges
Bhimbandh Wildlife Sanctuary
Bihar School of Yoga
Sita Kund hotspring
Rishi Kund hotspring
Pir Pahar
Jai Prakash Udyaan / Company Garden 
Dolphin ECO Park for the conservation of Gangetic river dolphin.
Mir Qasim's Tunnel
Peer Shah Nafah Shrine
Kharagpur Jheel (Lake) 
Goenka Shivalaya / Machli Talab

Transport

Rail

Munger has two railway stations known as: Jamalpur Junction and Munger Railway Station. The former is the main railhead for the city while the latter, which was earlier called Purabsarai Railway Station, acts as suburban facility. Stations are connected with Sahibganj Loop.

The bridge is the third-largest rail-cum-road bridge in India.

Road
Munger is connected to major parts of India by various National and State Highways. Regular bus service are provided by BSRTC for all the major cities and other destinations. Citybuses, Taxies, Autorikshaw, E-Rickshaw, etc. are available all the times in the entire city for transportation.

The Munger Ganga Bridge link Munger to various districts of North Bihar and north-eastern India by 2021.

Air
Munger Airport is located in Safyabad, which is 5 km from Munger. It was re-inaugurated by Chief Minister Nitish Kumar on 24 May 2016. Munger has no international airport with commercial service. Domestic airport with commercial service is Jay Prakash Narayan Airport in Patna around 180 km away, which is served by all major airlines.

Nearest international airport is Netaji Subhash Chandra Bose International Airport in Kolkata Which is around 480 km away from Munger.

Education
 Bihar School of Yoga is one of the notable organizations in the field of Yoga established in 1964 by Satyananda Saraswati.
 Indian Railway Institute of Mechanical and Electrical Engineering
 Biswanath Singh Institute of Legal Studies
 Munger University
 Government Engineering College, Munger
 Forestry College, Munger
 Rahmani Foundation, Munger

Notable people

Sharadindu Bandyopadhyay, Bengali writer, lawyer and script-writer in Hindi films.
Nandalal Bose, sculptor and painter
George Browne, 6th Marquess of Sligo (1856–1935), Anglo-Irish aristocrat, born in Munger
Mona Das - Washington State Senate
Brahmanand Mandal - Former MP from Munger Lok Sabha constituency
Muhammad Ali Mungeri, Indian Muslim scholar, founder Nadwatul Ulama
Wali Rahmani - General Secretary of All India Muslim Personal Law Board of India
Ramdhari Singh Dinkar, poet
Monazir Hassan -four-time MLA from Munger and one-time member of the Indian Parliament in 15th Lok Sabha (2009 to 2014) and represented Begusarai (Lok Sabha constituency).
Krishna Singh, first Chief Minister of Bihar and a freedom fighter
Kumar Suresh Singh, Director-General of Anthropological Survey of India
Udit Narayan Singh of Shakarpura Raj Zamindari- local benefactor
Niranjanananda Saraswati, yoga Guru
Satyananda Saraswati, founder of Bihar School of Yoga

References

External links

Munger District-Official Website
Munger Official National Website
Election commission

Cities and towns in Anga Desh
Cities and towns in Munger district